Terry K. Morrison is an American businessman and politician from the state of Maine. A Democrat, he served in the Maine House of Representatives from 2008 to 2016, representing the 122nd district which is centered on his hometown of South Portland.

Born and raised in Boothbay Harbor, Maine, Morrison moved to Portland as a teenager and graduated from Portland High School. He then attended Husson College in Bangor, majoring in business. He has since worked as a restaurant manager in South Portland.

Morrison has long been active in Maine politics. He served as vice chairman of the Cumberland County Democratic Committee and has been active in EqualityMaine. He first ran for public office in 2008, seeking to succeed the term-limited Larry Bliss in the 122nd House district. Morrison did not attract any primary opponents and faced Brian Durham, a Republican, in the general election. He won by 67 percent to 33 percent and took office in December 2008. He was reelected in 2010, 2012 and 2014. Term limits prevented him from seeking a fifth term in 2016.

Morrison is openly gay.

References

External links 
 Campaign website

Year of birth missing (living people)
Members of the Maine House of Representatives
Gay politicians
LGBT state legislators in Maine
Living people
People from Boothbay Harbor, Maine
Politicians from South Portland, Maine
Husson University alumni
21st-century American politicians
Portland High School (Maine) alumni